One Woman Is Not Enough? (German: Eine Frau genügt nicht?) is a 1955 West German drama film directed by Ulrich Erfurth and starring Hilde Krahl, Hans Söhnker and Rudolf Forster. It was shot at the Tempelhof Studios in West Berlin and on location in Munich and around Lake Starnberg. The film's sets were designed by the art directors Erich Kettelhut and Johannes Ott.

Synopsis
After a number of years of marriage, which remains childless, Ernst Vossberg has an affair with his secretary Renate and gets her pregnant. She then confronts his wife Maria  and demands she release him. She refuses and sometime later, after the mistress has given birth, they physically confront each other and Renate is killed. Maria then faces a trial for murder.

Cast
 Hilde Krahl as 	Maria Vossberg
 Hans Söhnker as 	Ernst Vossberg
 Rudolf Forster as 	Justizrat Dr. Kern
 Paul Hörbiger as Spielwaren-Ladenbesitzer Schratt
 Hans Reiser as Dr. Stefan Mertens
 Walther Süssenguth as 	Rechtsanwalt Dr. Körfer
 Heliane Bei as 	Renate Reinhard
 Annie Rosar as 	Frau Huber, Wirtschafterin
 Susi Nicoletti as 	Madame Colette
 Herbert Hübner as Generaldirektor Oppert
 Lola Müthel as 	Juliane, seine Frau
 Käthe Haack as 	Frau Wind, Geschworene
 Ernst Stahl-Nachbaur as 	Dr. Dickreiter
 Marina Ried as 	Frau Dr. Schultz, Geschworene
 Alice Treff as 	Mirjam Block, Privatdozentin
 Ralph Lothar as 	Landesgerichtsdirektor
 Elise Aulinger as 	Die Weinthaler-Bäuerin
 Beppo Brem as 	Portier im Gericht	
 Edith Schollwer as 	Frau Schratt
 Stanislav Ledinek as 	Friseur Wenzier
 Kurt Pratsch-Kaufmann as 	Reporter
 Erika Peters as 	Friseuse 
 Fritz Wagner as 	Junger Assessor 
 Inge Wolffberg as 	Dame im Spielwarenladen 
 Anneliese Würtz as Scheuerfrau im Gericht

References

Bibliography
 Bock, Hans-Michael & Bergfelder, Tim. The Concise CineGraph. Encyclopedia of German Cinema. Berghahn Books, 2009.

External links 
 

1955 films
1955 drama films
German drama films
West German films
1950s German-language films
Films directed by Ulrich Erfurth
1950s German films
Films shot at Tempelhof Studios
Films shot in Munich

de:Eine Frau genügt nicht?